Dayton High School may refer to:

Dayton High School (Kentucky), Dayton, Kentucky
Dayton High School (Nevada), Dayton, Nevada
Dayton High School (Oregon), Dayton, Oregon
Dayton High School (Texas), Dayton, Texas
Dayton High School (Washington), Dayton, Washington